Even as Eve is a 1920 American silent drama film by A. H. Fischer Features and distributed by Associated First National Pictures. Produced by B. A. Rolfe, the film was directed by Rolfe and Chester De Vonde, with Arthur A. Cadwell and Conrad Wells (as A. Fried) as cinematographers. It was filmed at the former Thanhouser Company studios in New Rochelle, New York. Some exterior scenes were filmed in the New York Adirondack Mountains and on a Long Island estate. It was based on the short story "The Shining Band" by Robert W. Chambers, and adapted by Charles Logue.

Plot
Eileen O'Hara lives with her father as members of a religious cult known as The Shining Band in a compound in the Adirondack Mountains. Her mother's infidelity years ago has left her father embittered. Peyster Sproul, as president of the Sagamore Club, tries to buy the O'Hara's land to become a Summer resort. Sproul is the man with whom Eileen's mother had the affair. Mr. O'Hara recognizes Sproul, they quarrel, and as a result Mr. O'Hara dies. Sproul then bribes Amasu Munn, the dishonest cult leader, to obtain an illegitimate claim on the property. Sproul tries to steal the deed from Eileen but is thwarted by young Dr. Lansing who has become enamored with Eileen. She then marries Dr. Lansing.

Cast

References

Sources
Miskatonic "Even As Eve"
Chambers, Robert W. (1904), A Young Man in a Hurry, New York: Harper & Brothers Publishers, at The Gutenberg Project

External links

 

1920 films
American silent feature films
American crime drama films
1920 crime drama films
Films based on works by Robert W. Chambers
First National Pictures films
American black-and-white films
Films directed by B. A. Rolfe
1920s American films
Silent American drama films
1920s English-language films